First Kiss is a 2012 American short comedy film directed by Charles Hood and music composed by Kevin Blumenfeld. First Kiss was screened at numerous film festivals throughout the US and won the Best Short Film award at the Omaha Film Festival and TriMedia Film Festival.

Cast
 Joseph Mazzello
 Brenda Song
 Michael Consiglio
 Max Amini
 Robert Harriell
 Marcy Harriell
 Robert Babish
 Natalie Victoria
 Dan Ramberg
 Chris LaCentra

References

External links
 

2012 films
2012 comedy films
American comedy short films
2012 short films
2010s English-language films
2010s American films